Iván Pérez Muñoz (born 29 January 1976) is a Spanish former professional footballer who played as a forward.

He amassed La Liga totals of 64 games and four goals over eight seasons, representing five clubs including Real Madrid and Deportivo.

Club career
Coming from Real Madrid's youth system, Madrid-born Pérez became a professional in 1994 with the reserves before making his first appearance with the first team the next season. Whilst under contract he had a loan spell with CF Extremadura, leaving in 1997 to sign with Real Betis and later playing briefly in France for FC Girondins de Bordeaux, before joining Deportivo de La Coruña in 1999.

With the Galicians, Pérez was a member of the 1999–2000 championship-winning squad, but only featured in three La Liga matches throughout the campaign, making just five league appearances over the course of three seasons combined. He later had loan stints at CD Numancia and CD Leganés, retiring in 2005 after one year with lowly Girona FC.

International career
In arguably the finest moment of his career, Pérez scored the only goal in the 1998 UEFA European Under-21 Championship final, as Spain downed Greece.

Personal life
Pérez was the younger brother of another footballer, Alfonso Pérez. Both began their careers with Real Madrid, and they played together for two seasons at Betis.

Honours
Spain U21
UEFA European Under-21 Championship: 1998

References

External links

1976 births
Living people
Footballers from Madrid
Spanish footballers
Association football forwards
La Liga players
Segunda División players
Segunda División B players
Real Madrid Castilla footballers
Real Madrid CF players
CF Extremadura footballers
Real Betis players
Deportivo de La Coruña players
CD Numancia players
CD Leganés players
Girona FC players
Ligue 1 players
FC Girondins de Bordeaux players
Spain youth international footballers
Spain under-21 international footballers
Spain under-23 international footballers
Spanish expatriate footballers
Expatriate footballers in France
Spanish expatriate sportspeople in France